Fazil is a 1928 American silent drama film directed by Howard Hawks and written by Philip Klein and Seton I. Miller. The film stars Charles Farrell, Greta Nissen, John Boles, Mae Busch, Tyler Brooke and John T. Murray. The film was released on June 4, 1928, by Fox Film Corporation.

Plot
A Middle Eastern prince has an affair with a Parisienne showgirl.

Cast
Charles Farrell as Prince Fazil
Greta Nissen as Fabienne
John Boles as John Clavering
Mae Busch as Helen Dubreuze
Tyler Brooke as Jacques Dubreuze
John T. Murray as Gondolier
 Vadim Uraneff as Ahmed.
Josephine Borio as Aicha
Eddie Sturgis as Rice
Erville Alderson as Iman Idris
Dale Fuller as Zouroya
Hank Mann as Ali

References

External links 
 

1928 films
1920s English-language films
Fox Film films
Silent American drama films
1928 drama films
Films directed by Howard Hawks
American black-and-white films
American films based on plays
American silent feature films
1920s American films